Metropolitan University Prague is a private university in the Czech Republic founded in 2001 as the University of Public Administration and International Relations. It provides Bachelor, Master and Ph.D. studies as full-time or part-time study. Courses offered include: Anglophone Studies, International Trade, International Relations and European Studies (available in Czech and in English), Industrial Property, Public Administration, Humanities and Asian Studies.

Since 2007, the university's International Relations Department has published a semiannual peer-reviewed academic journal entitled the Central European Journal of International and Security Studies.

External links
 Metropolitan University Prague

Educational institutions in Prague
Universities in the Czech Republic
2001 establishments in the Czech Republic
Educational institutions established in 2001